Andy Hawthorne, OBE is a British evangelist, author and founder of The Message Trust, a Christian mission organisation based in Manchester, UK. Working for over 30 years with young people and communities across the UK. His initiatives and the work of The Message Trust have been particularly directed at those who are traditionally hard to reach, in prison or from disadvantaged communities. Originally focused in Greater Manchester, The Message now works across the UK with hubs in Scotland, Wales, London, the Midlands and the North East, as well as Manchester. They also work internationally in Cape Town, South Africa, Vancouver, Canada and Annaberg-Buchholz, Germany. The story of The Message is told in his books, The Message 20: Celebrating Two Decades of Changed Lives and Being The Message: Lessons learned on the frontline of mission.

In recognition for his services to young people, he was awarded the OBE in 2011.

Hawthorne was named ‘Best Leader’ in The Sunday Times Best Not-For-Profit Organisations To Work For surveys in 2017 and 2018.

In the early days of The Message, Andy was a member of the Christian band World Wide Message Tribe who had success in the UK and American pop charts. He is a popular speaker at New Wine, Spring Harvest, Soul Survivor, Keswick Convention, and other Christian conferences in the UK. With Mike Pilavachi from Soul Survivor and Roy Crowne of YFC, he was one of the founders of the Hope 08 and subsequent Hope Together initiatives.

In 2018, Hawthorne was a key figure in launching Advance 2020, a coordinated campaign by Christian ministries to deliver a major evangelistic push in the UK in 2020. Speaking about the campaign, he said, ‘I felt like we need to see a multiplication of the evangelist gift, but also in Isaiah 60 it says, "assemble my people," and I felt like we need to start going big again.’

In 2022, Andy Hawthorne and The Message Trust partnered with the Luis Palau Association for a second time to put on Festival Manchester. Having originally held a mission in 2003, they decided to go again coming out of the Covid-19 pandemic. In the summer of 2022, Festival Manchester 2022 headed into schools, communities, ran thousands of hours of social action projects, before hosting a weekend festival in Wythenshawe Park in July. The weekend saw over 65,000 people attend. 

Andy is unashamed of his Christian faith and describes it as the 'engine' of all that has been achieved through The Message Trust. On 21 June 2011 he addressed cross-bench parliamentarians at the National Prayer Breakfast at the Houses of Parliament. Invited to speak on the theme of 'Raising the aspirations of young people', he said: ‘The Bible works – and Jesus is the answer... The message of the Bible raises the aspirations of young people – we ditch it at our peril. The best of our society is built on this precious book... The more we invest in today’s young people the values that God gave us in this book the better our society will become.’ 

Passionate about equipping people to share their faith, Andy started meeting monthly with 12 other evangelists in his office in Sharston. Each of them benefitted so much from meeting that they wanted to go on and set up their own Advance Group. Today, Advance Groups have grown internationally and 10,000 groups now meet in more than 90 countries across the globe.

Personal life 
Andy is married and the couple have two children.

Books and publications
 Hawthorne, Andy (2022), A Burning Heart: Wake up, grow up, build up, The Message Trust. 
 ——— (2019), Here I Am: Joining God's adventurous call to love the world, David C Cook. 
 ——— et al (2017), Being The Message: Lessons learned on the frontline of mission, The Message Trust. 
 ——— (2016), Here I Am, Seek Me: More teaching from the book of Isaiah and powerful stories from The Message Trust, The Message Trust. 
 ——— (2014), Here I Am, Send Me: Teaching from the book of Isaiah and powerful stories from The Message Trust, The Message Trust. 
 ———, Nicky Gumbel, Pete Greig, Luis Palau, Mike Pilavachi and John Sentamu (2011), The Message 20: Celebrating Two Decades of Changed Lives, The Message Trust. 
 ——— (2009), Hope Unleashed, Survivor Books. 
 ——— (2008), Diary of a Dangerous Vision (Revised), Survivor Books. 
 ——— (2005), The Smile of God, Survivor Books. 
 ——— (2004), Diary of a Dangerous Vision, Survivor Books. 
 ——— and Craig Borlase (2000), Mad for Jesus: The Vision of the World Wide Message Tribe, Hodder and Stoughton.  
 ——— and Jim Overton (1999), Get God, Zondervan.

References

External links
 Interview in the Manchester Evening News, July 6, 2012

English evangelists
British performers of Christian music
Living people
Year of birth missing (living people)